Chilukuri Narayana Rao was a Telugu writer, lexicographer, historian and scholar. He was born to Bheemasenarao and Lakshmamma in 1890 in Visakhapatnam District, British India.

His notable works include Amba, Upanishattulu, Musalamma, Vaade, Borrayyasetti, Gujaraati Vangmayamu. He also published Aandhra Bhaashaa Charitram in the year 1937 and a revised version of Sankaranarayana's English-Telugu Dictionary.

Awards
He received the honorary doctorate degree of ‘Kala Prapoorna' from Andhra University in the year 1947.

References

External links

Telugu writers
1890 births
1952 deaths
20th-century Indian historians
Writers from Andhra Pradesh
Tamil–Telugu translators